Jurijs Ševļakovs (born 24 January 1959 in Moscow, Soviet Union) is a former Latvian football defender, now a football manager.

Club playing career
His player career Ševļakovs began in CSKA Moscow where he played a couple of games in the reserves team but could not achieve more and left Moscow. In 1981, he joined his first senior team - Cement Novorossiysk. After one year in Novorossiysk Ševļakovs moved to FK Daugava Rīga where he played until 1990 having more than 330 appearances for the club. In 1991, he went to his first team outside the former USSR - Ilves in Finland. After three seasons in Finland he returned to Latvia and joined the strongest Latvian team at the time - FC Skonto and won the gold of Virslīga four times in a row, he was selected the best Latvian footballer of the year in 1997.

National team playing career
When in 1992 Latvia national football team started again Ševļakovs became one of the key players in it. Until the very end of his career Ševļakovs was the captain of the national team. One of his best games for Latvia came in a 2:0 home victory against Belarus when Ševļakovs scored both goals for Latvia. Despite his senior age for high level football Ševļakovs made 44 appearances for Latvia and was considered one of the countries most reliable defenders until the end of his playing career.

Coaching career
After finishing his career as player Ševļakovs instantly moved to coaching. His first squad was the reserves of FC Skonto, later he became assistant manager of Latvia U21 under Jurijs Andrejevs, after Andrejevs was elected Latvia national football team manager, Ševļakovs succeeded him as manager of U21. Currently Ševļakovs is assistant manager of FC Skonto and Latvia national team.

Honours
 Latvian Footballer of the Year - 1997
 Champion of Latvia - 4 (1994-1997)
 Latvian Cup winner - 2 (1995, 1997)
 Best defender in the Latvian championship - 3 (1994-1996)

References

External links

Latvian footballers
Soviet footballers
FC Chernomorets Novorossiysk players
Daugava Rīga players
Latvian Higher League players
Veikkausliiga players
Skonto FC players
Expatriate footballers in Finland
Latvian expatriate footballers
Latvian expatriate sportspeople in Finland
Russian footballers
Latvia international footballers
Living people
1959 births
Association football defenders
Footballers from Moscow